José Carlos Natário Ferreira (born 30 October 2001), better known as Zé Carlos, is a Portuguese professional footballer who plays as a right-back for the Primeira Liga club Vitória Guimarães, on loan from Varzim.

Club career
Zé Carlos is a youth product of the Portuguese clubs SC Senhora da Hora, CD Torrão, Salgueiros, Rio Ave, Famalicão, and Varzim. He began his senior career with Varzim in the Liga Portugal 2 for the 2021–22 season. On 26 August 2022, he joined Vitória Guimarães on loan in the Primeira Liga with an option to buy.

International career
Zé Carlos is a youth international for Portugal, having been called up to the Portugal U21s in 2022.

References

External links
 
 
 

2001 births
Living people
Sportspeople from Guimarães
Portuguese footballers
Portugal under-21 international footballers
Association football fullbacks
Varzim S.C. players
Vitória S.C. players
Primeira Liga players
Liga Portugal 2 players